The New York State Office of Mental Health Police (NYSOMH Police) is responsible for providing onsite security and fire safety/prevention services at the 23 state run psychiatric centers located in New York State.

History
The New York State Office of Mental Health Police was created through New York State Mental Hygiene Law to keep patients, staff, and visitors on the campus safe at all times, secure the grounds and buildings of the Office of Mental Health, prevent trespass, prevent patient escapes as well as to transport Office of Mental Health patients to and from court and other OMH facilities.

Ranks
The Civil Service title used by the New York State Department of Civil Service for OMH Police is "Safety and Security Officer".

There are three titles (referred to as ranks) within the agency:

Promotional exams are routinely given to obtain promotional opportunities.

Powers and Authority
New York State OMH Safety and Security Officers maintain Peace Officer status which grants them limited authority under the Mental Hygiene Law (section 7.25), Public Health Law (section 455) and the Criminal Procedure Law (section 2.10–12).

Equipment
New York State Mental Health Safety and Security Officers are prohibited by OMH policy to use or carry a firearm, but do carry a expandable baton, handcuffs, flashlight, and a radio that is directly linked to other officers and the main office of the facility. Many facilities also have radios linked to local, county and/or other state police agencies that operate near their facility to request and provide assistance. All members are issued and required to wear bullet resistant vests.

Training and Duties
Safety and Security Officers undergo the 7 week Peace Officer Training Academy at the Mohawk Valley Psychiatric Center located in Utica, New York. New Safety and Security officer must complete the "Peace Officer Basic Course" which includes training in:

After training each new Safety and Security officer completes a minimum six week on-the-job field training supervised by a senior officer from their respective facility.

Some of the duties performed by these officers include, but are not limited to, enforcing state and local laws, protecting persons and property, prevent and detect crime, search for and eliminate contraband, performing escorts of patients to off-site facilities, apprehending absconded patients and executing Mental Hygiene warrants.

Safety and Security Officers are also responsible for conducting fire service procedures which include conducting fire drills, fire safety classes, fire extinguisher inspections and building inspections. Furthermore they maintain peace, safety and security in their assigned facilities.

See also

 List of law enforcement agencies in New York
 New York State Office for People With Developmental Disabilities Police

References

External links
 New York State Office of Mental Health (OMH)
 Office of Mental Health in the New York Codes, Rules and Regulations
 Department of Mental Hygiene in the New York Codes, Rules and Regulations
Information about Kendra's Law, mental health policy in NYC and problems at the NYS Office of Mental Health
Mentally ill New Yorkers need help, article about overcrowding in NY State psychiatric facilities and response by Mental Health police to overcrowded conditions
 (New York State Office of Mental Health Police video)

State law enforcement agencies of New York (state)
Specialist police departments of New York (state)